Aboubacar Sidiki Koné (born 21 August 1984) is a Malian football player who last played for MH Nakhon Si City in Thai League 3.

Career 
Koné played for AS Bamako, before signed 2006 to Al-Merrikh SC. He played one and a half-year in Sudan for Al-Merrikh and moved than to MAS Fes. Koné played four years in Morocco, before left the club in January 2011 to join Algerian side JS Kabylie. In summer 2012 returned to Mali and signed with Djoliba AC.

International 
He was part of the Mali U-20 team who finish third in group stage of 2003 FIFA World Youth Championship, and was part of the Malian 2004 Olympic football team, who exited in the quarter finals, finishing top of group A, but losing to Italy in the next round.

Koné was selected for the 2008 Africa Cup of Nations. He made his debut with the senior side in a 2006 FIFA World Cup qualifying match against Liberia on 5 June 2005.

References

External links

1984 births
Living people
Malian footballers
Malian expatriate footballers
Mali international footballers
Mali under-20 international footballers
Olympic footballers of Mali
Malian expatriate sportspeople in Sudan
Expatriate footballers in Morocco
Footballers at the 2004 Summer Olympics
2008 Africa Cup of Nations players
AS Bamako players
Al-Merrikh SC players
Sportspeople from Bamako
Association football defenders
21st-century Malian people